Harp Okulu SK, formerly known as Harbiye, is the sports club of the Turkish Military Academy based in Ankara, Turkey. Originally founded in Istanbul under the name Harbiye, the club relocated to the capital Ankara in 1936. The name was changed to Harp Okulu in the following years. Being active in numerous sports, the club has won its greatest successes in football and basketball.

The football department won the Turkish Football Championship in 1924 and thus became the first champions in Turkish football history. In the 1940s they won the championship title again in 1942 and 1945. The basketball department won the former Turkish Basketball Championship twice in a row in 1951 and 1952.

Honours

Football
 Turkish Football Championship
 Winners (3) (shared-record): 1924, 1942, 1945
 Runners-up (1): 1944

 Prime Minister's Cup
 Runners-up (1): 1945

 Ankara Football League
 Winners (4): 1937–38, 1941–42, 1943–44, 1944–45

Basketball
 Turkish Basketball Championship
 Winners (2): 1951, 1952
 Runners-up (2): 1949, 1950

Volleyball
 Turkish Volleyball Championship
 Runners-up (1): 1963

References

Turkish Military Academy
Sports teams in Ankara
Multi-sport clubs in Turkey
Military sports clubs